William Thomas "Liam" Holowesko (born September 1, 2000) is an American-Bahamian professional road cyclist, who currently rides for UCI Continental team .

Career
Born in Nassau, Holowesko won the Bahamas Cycling Federation's junior National Time Trial in the open all-ages category at the age of 13, in 2014, riding on a Cervélo S2. He won the time trials again in 2015, and came in second in the road race. In the Junior Tour of Ireland in 2016, riding for the US based Hot Tubes, Holowesko held the white jersey for two consecutive days.

He is a two-time USA Junior National Time Trial Champion. He also won the Bahamian National Road Race Championships in 2018, and the Bahamas Pro National Championship Time Trials in 2014, 2015 and 2017.

Major results

2014
 Bahamian National Road Championships
1st  Time trial
2nd Road race
 1st  Time trial (Junior 13–14), United States National Amateur Road Championships
2015
 Bahamian National Road Championships
1st  Time trial
2nd Road race
2016
 1st  Time trial (Junior 15–16), United States National Amateur Road Championships
2017
 1st  Time trial, Bahamian National Road Championships
2018
 1st  Road race, Bahamian National Road Championships

References

External links

2000 births
Living people
Bahamian male cyclists
Sportspeople from Nassau, Bahamas
American male cyclists